Chen Yin (born March 29, 1986 in Qinhuangdao, Hebei) is a Chinese swimmer, who competed for Team China at the 2008 Summer Olympics and 2012 Summer Olympics, both times in the men's 200 m butterfly.

Major achievements
2005 National Games - 2nd 200 m fly;
2006 Asian Championships - 1st 200 m fly

References

External links
 Chinese Olympic Team  2008 Chinese Olympic Team Roster

1986 births
Living people
Chinese male butterfly swimmers
Olympic swimmers of China
People from Qinhuangdao
Swimmers from Hebei
Swimmers at the 2008 Summer Olympics
Swimmers at the 2012 Summer Olympics
Asian Games medalists in swimming
Swimmers at the 2006 Asian Games
Swimmers at the 2010 Asian Games
Universiade medalists in swimming
Asian Games bronze medalists for China
Medalists at the 2010 Asian Games
Universiade silver medalists for China
Medalists at the 2007 Summer Universiade
20th-century Chinese people
21st-century Chinese people